Kenneth Weiss may refer to:

 Kenneth M. Weiss, professor of anthropology and genetics at Pennsylvania State University
 Kenneth P. Weiss, American entrepreneur, human factors engineer and inventor
 Kenneth R. Weiss, (born 1957) investigative journalist for the Los Angeles Times
 Kenneth Weiss (conductor)